A New Deal for Transport: Better for everyone was a white paper published by the United Kingdom government in 1997 setting out the government's transport policy.

See also
A New Deal for Trunk Roads in England
Transport Direct Portal

References

External links
A New Deal for Transport: Better for everyone (DfT)

Transport policy in the United Kingdom
Roads in the United Kingdom
White papers
1997 in the United Kingdom